A die defect is a unique and unintentional flaw in a coin die and is created through excessive use or polishing of the die. A die bearing such a defect is occasionally referred to as a defective die. Generally, and depending upon the magnitude of the defect, coins that are produced from these dies are considered error coins. Also, the term encompasses a wide variety of design errors that were engraved into the die originally and were slipped into circulation before the incorrect design was discovered.

Types

Die crack
A die crack occurs when a die, after being subjected to immense pressure during the minting process, cracks, causing a small gap in the die. If this damaged die continues to produce coins, the metal will fill into the crack, thus revealing a raised line of metal in the finished coin. Specimens with more prominent die cracks can command a high premium and are valued greatly by some collectors. However, less obvious errors are quite common, especially in the 50 States Commemorative Quarter Program, yielding a lower value.

Cud

A cud on a coin is a damaged area resembling a blob at the edge of the coin. Cuds result from a piece of the perimeter of the die breaking away. They can be any shape depending on the shape of the piece that broke off the die.

See also

Coining (mint)
Die-deterioration doubling
Doubled die
Wavy step
US error coins
Mint-made errors

References

External links
 Coinsite error coin prices

Currency production
Mint-made errors